Laurent Foirest (born 18 September 1973) is a former French professional basketball player. At a height of 6' 6" (1.98 m) tall, he played at the small forward position.

Professional career
Foirest played professionally with Saski Baskonia of the Spanish Liga ACB.

National team career
Foirest won a silver medal with the senior French national basketball team at the 2000 Summer Olympic Games.

References

1973 births
Living people
ASVEL Basket players
Basketball players at the 2000 Summer Olympics
Élan Béarnais players
French expatriate basketball people in Spain
French men's basketball players
Liga ACB players
Medalists at the 2000 Summer Olympics
Olympic basketball players of France
Olympic medalists in basketball
Olympic silver medalists for France
Olympique Antibes basketball players
Saski Baskonia players
Shooting guards
2006 FIBA World Championship players